BBC Radio Suffolk is the BBC's local radio station serving the county of Suffolk.

It broadcasts on FM, DAB, digital TV and via BBC Sounds from studios on St Matthews Street in Ipswich.

According to RAJAR, the station has a weekly audience of 89,000 listeners and a 6.6% share as of December 2022.

Overview
BBC Radio Suffolk began broadcasting on 12 April 1990. In 2004, it won was named Station of the Year in the Sony Radio Academy Awards.

Transmitters
BBC Radio Suffolk broadcasts to north-east Suffolk on 95.5 FM from the Oulton transmitter, east Suffolk on 95.9 FM from the Aldeburgh transmitter, Ipswich and south-east Suffolk on 103.9 FM from the Manningtree transmitter (which also carries BBC Essex) and west Suffolk on 104.6 FM from the Great Barton transmitter.

DAB transmissions from the Suffolk MUX began on 7 October 2017, on digital frequency 10C from Mendlesham (Central Suffolk and Ipswich), Puttock's Hill (Bury St Edmunds), Warren Heath (Ipswich), Felixstowe (Town and Dock area). Due to the low number of masts currently in use, there is a lack of coverage along the Suffolk coast north of Felixstowe to Lowestoft. Sudbury, Newmarket, Haverhill, Lowestoft, Southwold and Beccles and Bungay also have very poor or no DAB coverage of the Suffolk MUX. BBC Radio Suffolk was the penultimate BBC Local Radio station to launch on DAB.

As part of the roll out of BBC local radio stations on Freeview, Radio Suffolk was added to Freeview channel 720 in the east of England on 6 June 2016. The station broadcasts from the Sudbury and Tacolneston transmitters and their dependent relays.

Radio Suffolk does not broadcast on Medium wave.

Programming
Local programming is produced and broadcast from the BBC's Ipswich studios from 6am - 10pm on Mondays - Saturdays and from 6am - 2pm on Sundays.

Radio Suffolk is licensed to broadcast commentary on all of Ipswich Town's league and cup games on FM and DAB, but not on Freeview or via the BBC Sounds app.

Off-peak programming, including the Saturday and Sunday late shows from 10pm - 1am, originates from BBC Three Counties Radio, BBC Radio Norfolk, BBC Radio Northampton and BBC Essex. The Eastern Counties' 10pm - 1am weekday late show originates from Radio Suffolk, and is presented by Nick Risby.

During the station's downtime, BBC Radio Suffolk simulcasts overnight programming from BBC Radio 5 Live and BBC Radio London.

See also
Suffolk Youth Orchestra

References

External links
 
 History of local radio in Suffolk
 Transmitter Coverage Maps
 Aldeburgh transmitter
 Great Barton transmitter
 Manningtree transmitter (includes coverage map)

Suffolk
Companies based in Suffolk
Radio stations in Suffolk